Julius Ludorf (2 December 1919 – 1 February 2015) was a German footballer who played as a forward for SpVgg Erkenschwick, Hannover 96 and Kickers Offenbach.

References

1919 births
2015 deaths
German footballers
SpVgg Erkenschwick players
Association football forwards
Hannover 96 players
Kickers Offenbach players